Serxhio Abdurahmani (born 17 July 1992) is an Albanian footballer currently playing for Atsalenios FC in Greece, as a forward.

External links
Soccerway Profile
Myplayer.gr Profile

1992 births
Living people
Footballers from Elbasan
Albanian footballers
Association football forwards
Albanian men's footballers
AEK Athens F.C. players
Niki Volos F.C. players
Fokikos A.C. players
FK Kukësi players
Vyzas F.C. players
Panelefsiniakos F.C. players
Super League Greece players
Albanian expatriate footballers
Expatriate footballers in Greece
Albanian expatriate sportspeople in Greece